İbrahim Eren (born 26 May 1980) is a Turkish bureaucrat.

Education 
He graduated the Department of Political Science and International Relations of Boğaziçi University and went on to pursue a master of arts in Media Management from the University of Westminster.

Career 
Eren started his career at different companies in the field of culture and arts, later producing many programs, including national and international documentaries, animations, promotional films and commercials in the media production sector.

He started to work at ATV within Turkuvaz Media Group in 2008. After his appointment,  Eren also relaunched TRT 2 after seven years of inactivity.

İbrahim Eren was, as director general of TRT, a member of the board of directors of the European Broadcasting Union (EBU) and is currently the president of the Asia-Pacific Broadcasting Union (ABU), as well as a board member for Türksat in the International Emmy Awards.

References 

1980 births
Living people
Alumni of the University of Westminster
Boğaziçi University alumni
Turkish Radio and Television Corporation people